Phil Wilson (born 1939 in Ballyhogue, County Wexford) is a retired Irish sportsperson. He played hurling at various times with his local clubs Ballyhogue
, Oylgate-Glenbrien and Rapparees and with the Wexford senior inter-county team from 1961 until 1974.

Playing career

Club
Wilson began his club hurling career with the Ballyhogue club before later moving to Oylgate-Glenbrien.  Here he enjoyed his first success by winning a senior county title in 1963.  Wilson later moved to the newly formed Rapparees club in Enniscorthy where he won a second county title in 1978.

Inter-county
Wilson first came to prominence on the inter-county scene with the Wexford senior team in 1961.  He made his debut that year, however, Wexford were defeated by Kilkenny in the Leinster final.

In 1962, Wilson tasted success for the first time when he captured a first Leinster medal as Kilkenny fell by 3-9 to 2-10.  A second All-Ireland final meeting with Tipperary in two years beckoned for Wexford and Wilson. The Leinster men got off to a bad start as Tom Moloughney and Seán Moloughney scored two goals for Tipp inside the first minute. Wexford fought back and the game remained level for most of the rest of the match. Jimmy O'Brien scored a remarkable goal from all of seventy yards to even up the game again. It was not enough for Wexford as Tipperary won the game by 3-10 to 2-11.

Wexford were outclassed in Leinster for the next two years, however, 1965 saw Wilson add a second provincial medal to his collection as arch-rivals Kilkenny fell once again. Yet again Wexford faced Tipperary in the All-Ireland final. Of all their meetings in recent years this proved to be the most one-sided. Tipp won easily with two unorthodox hand-passed goals by Seán McLoughlin. Tipp also scored seven unanswered points in the last quarter to win the game by 2-16 to 0-10. Wilson won his only All-star this year.

In 1967, Wilson played a key role in helping Wexford to capture the National Hurling League title. The following year he won his third Leinster title. Kilkenny, who were the reigning All-Ireland champions, were accounted for in the provincial decider on a score line of 3-13 to 4-9. For the fourth time of the decade Wexford subsequently faced Tipperary in the All-Ireland final with the Munster men leading by two victories to one. Wilson, however, had never ended up on the winning side. At half-time it looked as if Tipp were cruising to another victory as they took an eight-point lead. Just after the restart Wexford had a Christy Jacob goal disallowed before Tony Doran scored a goal after just six minutes. Tipp fought back; however, it was too late as Wexford won by 5-8 to 3-12.  It was Wilson’s first All-Ireland medal.

In a similar pattern to previous years Wexford lost their provincial crown the year after reaching the All-Ireland final. Wilson, however, won a fourth Leinster medal in 1970 as All-Ireland champions Kilkenny fell in the provincial final. Galway were defeated in the penultimate game of the championship, setting up an All-Ireland final meeting with Cork, Wexford’s nemesis at underage levels. For the first time ever the final would be contested over eighty minutes instead of the usual sixty.  The game itself was an exciting affair with a record sixty-four scores and eleven goals in all, however, Wilson did not make the starting fifteen. After a free-flowing game Cork emerged victorious by 6-21 to 5-10.

Wilson played in his next Leinster final in 1971. The Kilkenny team of that era, a team often described as the greatest of all-time, provided the opposition on that occasion. In fact, it was the first of five successive defeats at the hands of Kilkenny in Leinster finals for Wexford. In spite of a lack of success in the championship Wilson collected a second National League medal as a substitute in 1973. He retired from inter-county hurling at the start of 1974.

Provincial
Wilson also lined out with Leinster in the inter-provincial hurling competition. He first played for his province in 1964 as Leinster defeated Munster to take the Railway Cup. Wilson added further Railway Cup medals to his collection in 1965 and 1972.

Teams

References

1939 births
Living people
Oylegate-Glenbrien hurlers
Rapparees hurlers
Leinster inter-provincial hurlers
All-Ireland Senior Hurling Championship winners